A garden is an area set aside for the cultivation and enjoyment of plant and other natural life.

Garden may also refer to:

Places

United Kingdom
Buckingham Palace Garden, full title The Garden at Buckingham Palace, and often referred to as The Garden
 Kent, the "Garden of England"

United States 
Garden, Michigan
Garden, Ohio
Garden, Utah
Garden County, Nebraska
Garden Lake, a lake in Minnesota
Garden Township (disambiguation), several
Jacqueline Kennedy Garden, Washington, D.C.
Madison Square Garden, in New York City, nicknamed "The Garden"
New Jersey, a U.S. state also known as the "Garden State"
White House Rose Garden, Washington, D.C.

Elsewhere
 Garden, Karachi, one of the neighbourhoods of Saddar Town in Karachi, Sindh, Pakistan
 Garden Island (disambiguation), several
 Gardens, Cape Town
 Victoria (Australia), an Australian state also known as the "Garden State"

People
Garden (surname)

Arts, entertainment, and media

Music
 Garden (album), a live album by Cecil Taylor
 Gardens (album), by Sly Withers, 2021
 "Garden" (Totally Enormous Extinct Dinosaurs song), 2011
 "Garden", a 1983 song by the Fall from Perverted by Language
 "Garden", a 1991 song by Pearl Jam from Ten
 "Garden", a 2017 song by Dua Lipa from Dua Lipa
 "Garden", a 2003 song by Sayaka Kanda

Other uses in arts, entertainment, and media
Garden (Final Fantasy VIII), a group of military academies in the video game Final Fantasy VIII
 Garden, one of the linked diptych of plays by Alan Ayckbourn published together as House & Garden
 Garden, one of the television idents in the BBC Two '1991–2001' idents package.

Computing and technology
CSS Zen Garden, a web development resource
Garden framework, upon which the Vanilla forum is built 
Walled garden, another name for a closed system

Garden types and their uses
Alpine garden
Botanical garden
Hanging garden (cultivation)
Market gardening, small-scale production of fruits, vegetables and flowers as cash crops
Walled garden, a garden enclosed by high walls for horticultural purposes

Other uses
"The Garden", the name given to the school of Epicurus in Athens
The Garden Company Limited, Hong Kong-based bakery and confectionery manufacturer

See also
Garden apartment
Gardening club
Hans Majestet Kongens Garde (His Majesty The King's Guard; the Royal Guards), a battalion of the Norwegian Army
Home garden (disambiguation)
List of garden types
List of gardens
The Garden (disambiguation)
Torture Garden (disambiguation)